Charles Matthew Hunnam (born 10 April 1980) is an English actor. He is best known for his roles as Pete Dunham in Green Street Hooligans (2005) and as Jax Teller in the FX series Sons of Anarchy (2008–2014).  For the latter, he was twice nominated for the Critics' Choice Television Award for Best Actor.

Hunnam also portrayed the title role in Nicholas Nickleby (2002), Raleigh Becket in Pacific Rim (2013), Alan McMichael in Crimson Peak (2015), Percy Fawcett in The Lost City of Z (2016), the title role in King Arthur: Legend of the Sword (2017), William "Ironhead" Miller in Triple Frontier,  Raymond Smith in The Gentlemen (both in 2019), and  Detective Charlie Waldo in Last Looks (2022).

His other notable television roles include Nathan Maloney in the Channel 4 drama Queer as Folk (1999–2000), Lloyd Haythe on the Fox series Undeclared (2001–2002) and  Dale Conti/Lindsay "Linbaba" Ford in the Apple TV+ series  Shantaram (2022).

Early life
Charles Matthew Hunnam was born in Newcastle upon Tyne on 10 April 1980, the son of Jane Bell, a ballet dancer and business owner, and William Hunnam. One of his grandmothers was a portrait artist. He has said that his mother "did a very good job" of being a single parent. He has an older brother named William and two younger half brothers on his mother's side named Oliver and Christian.

At age 12, when his mother remarried, the family moved to Melmerby, Cumbria. During his adolescence, he played rugby football and fought with his classmates. After that, instead of going to university, he decided to go to the Cumbria College of Art and Design in Carlisle (now part of the University of Cumbria) to study performing arts. He graduated with a dual degree in film theory and film history with a side in performing arts. He planned to write and direct his own films.

Career

Early work
Hunnam was discovered at the age of 17 in a branch of JD Sports on Christmas Eve, while playing around with his brother during a trip to buy shoes. A production manager for the Newcastle-based teen drama Byker Grove approached Hunnam and he was later cast in his first role as Jason for three episodes of the show. He also had a brief modelling career where he did a photo shoot for Kangol Caps and then decided modelling was not for him. Hunnam's first major role came at age 18 when he was cast by Russell T Davies as 15-year-old schoolboy Nathan Maloney in Davies' Channel 4 drama Queer as Folk. He followed this up with his role as Daz in the film Whatever Happened to Harold Smith? (1999) and then moved to the United States.

His career expanded to include a recurring role as Gregor Ryder in the WB series Young Americans. He then appeared in the short-lived Fox series Undeclared as an English drama student called Lloyd Haythe. Despite critical acclaim, the series was cancelled after one season. Hunnam then appeared on the large screen in Abandon (2002), Nicholas Nickleby (2002), and Cold Mountain (2003). Hunnam has stated that he does not wish to simply take any role that is offered, saying, "I have 60 years to make the money, but the choices I make in the next five years are really going to define my career."

This decision resulted in his return to the UK to take the lead role of Pete Dunham in the film Green Street Hooligans (2005); however, his attempt at delivering a Cockney accent resulted in his inclusion in many critics' "worst accents in movie history" lists. Hunnam said his role as Patric, a member of "The Fishes" in Children of Men (2006), was the final part in his "trilogy of mad men": "I played the psycho in Cold Mountain, my character in Green Street Hooligans is fairly psychotic and now I've got this role."

2008–2012

From 2008 to 2014, Hunnam starred in Sons of Anarchy as Jackson "Jax" Teller leader of SAMCRO, a prominent motorcycle club set in the fictional town of Charming, California. Hunnam was cast after Kurt Sutter, the creator of the show, saw him in Green Street Hooligans. His portrayal as Jax Teller has led Hunnam to receive a Critics' Choice Television Award nomination, three EWwy Award nominations for Best Lead Actor in a Drama series, and a PAAFTJ Award nomination for Best Cast in a Drama Series.

In 2011, Hunnam played the role of Gavin Nichols in the philosophical drama/thriller The Ledge by Matthew Chapman.

In 2012, he starred as the title character in the indie comedy 3,2,1... Frankie Go Boom alongside his Sons of Anarchy co-star Ron Perlman. Hunnam said he considered the day he filmed scenes with Perlman the best and funniest day of filming he's had in his career. He also appeared as Jay, an ex-boxer, in Stefan Ruzowitzky's crime drama Deadfall (2012).

2013–2019

Hunnam starred as Raleigh Becket in Guillermo del Toro's sci-fi film Pacific Rim, which opened in July 2013 and grossed $411 million worldwide. It was announced on 2 September 2013 that Hunnam would play the lead role of Christian Grey in the film adaptation of E. L. James' novel Fifty Shades of Grey. However, on 12 October 2013, Universal Pictures announced that Hunnam had withdrawn from the film due to conflicts with the schedule of his series Sons of Anarchy.

On 2 June 2014, Hunnam was awarded a Huading Award for Best Global Emerging Actor, for his role as Raleigh in Pacific Rim due to the film performing well in Asian markets. Hunnam reunited with del Toro in the horror film Crimson Peak, alongside Mia Wasikowska, Tom Hiddleston, and Jessica Chastain. The film began shooting in February 2014 and was released on 16 October 2015.

Hunnam starred as geographer Percy Fawcett in James Gray's adaptation of author David Grann's 2009 book, The Lost City of Z: A Tale of Deadly Obsession in the Amazon. Gray dubbed his adventure drama The Lost City of Z, which  filmed from August–October 2015. The film had its world  premiere 15 October 2016 as the closing night selection at the New York Film Festival. It was released in the United States on 14 April 2017. Hunnam played the eponymous title role in Guy Ritchie's action-adventure film King Arthur: Legend of the Sword, which was filmed between March and July 2015. It was released in May 2017. He next starred in Guy Ritchie's 2019 film The Gentlemen alongside Matthew McConaughey.

2020-present
Hunnam portrayed Charlie Waldo in the 2022 mystery/thriller Last Looks which also featured Mel Gibson. His first feature for Apple TV+, Shantaram,  premiered 14 October 2022. Hunnam leads the cast of characters as Dale Conti/Lindsay "Linbaba" Ford.  The series is based on  Gregory David Roberts' 2003 autobiographical novel. 

On 9 February 2023 Deadline Hollywood reported that Hunnam is part of the ensemble cast Director Zack Snyder is gathering for his upcoming Netflix project Rebel Moon. The project will reunite Hunnam with  King Arthur: Legend of the Sword cast mate Djimon Hounsou. Sir Anthony Hopkins has also been cast in a voice role. The epic space opera is scheduled for release on Netflix 22 December 2023. There is a limited theatrical  release being planned.

Screenwriting
Immediately prior to getting cast on Sons of Anarchy, Hunnam sold his screenplay Vlad to Summit Entertainment with Brad Pitt's Plan B Entertainment co-producing. The film is being directed by music video director and photographer Anthony Mandler, and will focus on the real-life story of Vlad the Impaler. Hunnam learned the story from locals in Romania while shooting Cold Mountain. He stated that he had not acted in 18 months and was so broke that if he had not managed to sell the script he would have had to sell his house and move back to England to live with his mother.

In 2013, Hunnam mentioned he was developing a screenplay based on a 2011 Rolling Stone article that he optioned about Edgar Valdez Villareal, an American drug lord who ran one of the biggest cartels in Mexico. Another project he has in development is a film about gypsy culture in Britain, which he hopes to direct. He stated that it is "a part of English society that's really seldom been explored, but is one of the most colourful and interesting parts of British society."

Personal life
Hunnam met actress Katharine Towne, daughter of actress Julie Payne and filmmaker Robert Towne, in 1999 when they both auditioned for roles on Dawson's Creek. After dating for three weeks, they married in Las Vegas; they divorced in 2002. He dated model Sophie Dahl, actress Stella Parker and film producer Georgina Townsley.

He has been in a relationship with artist Morgana McNelis since 2005.

Hunnam has dyslexia, as well as a fear of germs and dirt. In 2016, he began training in Brazilian jiu-jitsu under Rigan Machado, and received his blue belt in October 2018.

Filmography

Film

Television

Awards and nominations

Film

Television

References

External links

 

1980 births
20th-century English male actors
21st-century English male actors
Male actors from Newcastle upon Tyne
British expatriate male actors in the United States
English expatriates in the United States
English male film actors
English male television actors
English people of Irish descent
English people of Scottish descent
English practitioners of Brazilian jiu-jitsu
Living people
Actors with dyslexia